Foreign-born (also non-native) people are those born outside of their country of residence. Foreign born are often non-citizens, but many are naturalized citizens of the country in which they live, and others are citizens by descent, typically through a parent.

The term foreign born encompasses both immigrants and expatriates but is not synonymous with either. Foreign born may, like immigrants, have committed to living in a country permanently or, like expatriates, live abroad for a significant period with the plan to return to their birth-country eventually.

The status of foreign born — particularly their access to citizenship — differs globally. The large groups of foreign-born guest workers in the Gulf Cooperation Council states, for example, have no right to citizenship no matter the length of their residence. In the United Kingdom, Canada, Australia and the United States, by contrast, foreign born are often citizens or in the process of becoming citizens. Certain countries have intermediary rules: in Germany and Japan it is often difficult but not impossible for the foreign born to become citizens.

Definition 
The adjective foreign-born has two potential meanings:
 "born in a country other than that in which one resides."
 "foreign by birth."

The United Nations uses the first definition to estimate the international migrant stock, whenever this information is available. In countries lacking data on place of birth, the UN uses the country of citizenship instead.

On the other hand, the United States Census Bureau defines foreign-born as "anyone who is not a U.S. citizen at birth", which includes persons who have become U.S. citizens through naturalization but excludes persons born abroad to a U.S. citizen parent or parents.

According to the UN: "Equating international migrants with foreign citizens when estimating the migrant stock has important shortcomings. In countries where citizenship is conferred on the basis of jus sanguinis, people who were born in the country of residence may be included in the number of international migrants even though they may have never lived abroad. Conversely, persons who were born abroad and who naturalized in their country of residence are excluded from the stock of international migrants when using citizenship as the criterion to define international migrants."

Trends by country 

The percentage of foreign born in a country is the product mostly of immigration rates, but is also affected by emigration rates and birth and death rates in the destination country. For example, the United Kingdom and Ireland are destination countries for migrants from Eastern Europe, Africa, and Asia, but are themselves source countries for immigration to other English-speaking countries.

The Holy See is unique in having 100% of its population foreign-born, while Cuba is unique in having 0% of its population foreign-born. The region with the highest rate is Oceania, with 21%, while Asia has less than 1%.

Countries with immigration rates above 25% tend to be wealthy countries with relatively open migration or labour laws, including Singapore, Australia, New Zealand, Switzerland and the Persian Gulf states.

The largest foreign-born population in the world is in the United States, which was home to 39 million foreign-born residents in 2012, or 12.6% of the population.

Cities with largest foreign born populations

Metropolitan and Urban regions with largest foreign born populations
 Data for the cities listed below is from numerous sources.

See also 
 Alien (law)
 Expatriate
 Immigration
 Naturalization
 Finishing School
 Foreign-born Japanese
 Immigrant generations

Notes

References

External links
ForeignBorn - a resource for entering and living in the US
US Census Bureau on foreign born population
Luxembourg – Country Summary
Migration article from U.C. Davis

Human migration
Employment of foreign-born